Laudakia wui, also known as Wui's rock agama, is a species of agamid lizard. It is found in Tibet.

References

Laudakia
Reptiles of China
Endemic fauna of Tibet
Reptiles described in 1998
Taxa named by Zhao Ermi